Reinis is a Latvian masculine given name and surname and may refer to:

As a given name:
Reinis Kaudzīte (1839–1920), Latvian schoolteacher and writer
Reinis Nitišs (born 1995), Latvian rallycross driver
Reinis Rozītis (born 1982), Latvian bobsledder and Olympic competitor
Reinis Zālītis (1943–2005), Latvian footballer 

As a surname:
Jānis Reinis (born 1960), Latvian actor

Latvian masculine given names